Swords: Life on the Line is a reality television series produced by Original Productions for the Discovery Channel.  The series documents the events aboard New England fishing boats fishing for Swordfish. See Longline fishing.

The series follows a similar format to Deadliest Catch. In the first season, television crews are placed on four boats to tape their fishing season: The Eagle Eye II, Big Eye, Sea Hawk, and Frances Anne. In Season 2, the Sea Hawk was replaced by the Bjorn II by the boat's captain. In the third season, the Bjorn II was replaced by Linda Greenlaw's first boat the Hannah Boden

The series was partially inspired by The Perfect Storm.

Episodes

Season 1 (2009)

Featured boats
 F/V Eagle Eye II - Scotty Drabinowicz
 F/V Big Eye - Chris "Chompers" Hanson
 F/V Sea Hawk - Linda Greenlaw
 F/V Frances Anne - Chris "Slick" Kleme
 F/V Destiny - Billy Kingett: F/V Desinty was seen giving charts to the Big Eye
 F/V Eagle Eye: F/V Eagle Eye dropped off crewmen for the Eagle Eye II

Season 2 (2010)

Featured boats
F/V Eagle Eye II - Scotty Drabinowicz
F/V Big Eye - Chris "Chompers" Hanson
F/V Bjorn II - Linda Greenlaw
F/V Frances Anne - Chris "Slick" Kleme and Rick Mears (Mears replaced Kleme partway through the season)

Season 3 (2011)

Featured boats
F/V Eagle Eye II - Scotty Drabinowicz 
F/V Big Eye - Chris "Chompers" Hanson
F/V Hannah Boden - Linda Greenlaw
F/V Frances Anne - Chris "Slick" Kleme
F/V Alex Marie:The Alex Marie was seen giving mechanical parts to the Hannah Boden, tied up during Hurricane Igor behind the Big Eye, and eventually being towed in by the Big Eye when the Alex Marie became disabled

See also
 Deadliest Catch
 Lobster Wars
 Wicked Tuna

References

External links 
 
 

Discovery Channel original programming
2009 American television series debuts
2000s American reality television series
Fishing television series
Television series by Original Productions
English-language television shows
2012 American television series endings